Márcia Aparecida Ciol is a Brazilian-American medical statistician and biostatistician known for her research on comorbidity. She works as a research associate professor in the University of Washington's Department of Rehabilitation Medicine, maintains an affiliation with the Center for Brazilian Studies at the University of Washington Tacoma, and is a past president of the Caucus for Women in Statistics.

Ciol earned bachelor's and master's degrees in statistics from the University of Campinas in 1979 and 1982 respectively. She earned a second master's degree in biostatistics from the University of Washington in 1987, and completed her Ph.D. at the University of Washington in 1991. Her dissertation, An Adaptive Case-Cohort Design, was supervised by Steven Self.

References

External links

Year of birth missing (living people)
Living people
American women statisticians
Brazilian statisticians
State University of Campinas alumni
University of Washington alumni
University of Washington faculty
21st-century American women